The 2021 Copa Colombia, officially the Copa BetPlay Dimayor 2021 for sponsorship reasons, was the 19th edition of the Copa Colombia, the national cup competition for clubs of DIMAYOR. The tournament was contested by 35 teams and began on 10 March 2021. It ended on 24 November 2021, with Atlético Nacional winning their fifth title in the competition after defeating Deportivo Pereira in the double-legged final series by a 5–1 aggregate score. As champions, Atlético Nacional qualified for the 2022 Copa Libertadores.

Independiente Medellín were the defending champions, having won the competition in its two most recent editions. They were eliminated by Deportivo Cali in the round of 16.

Format
The format for the 2021 Copa Colombia was the same one used for the 2018 and 2020 editions, with the competition being played in a single-elimination format in its entirety, without any group stages. The 16 Categoría Primera B teams entered the competition in the first stage, being drawn into eight ties. After two stages, four Primera B teams qualified for the third stage, along with ten Categoría Primera A teams that did not enter international competition in the 2021 season, which entered the cup at that stage. Finally, in the round of 16, the seven third stage winners were joined by the four Copa Libertadores qualifiers (América de Cali, Santa Fe, Junior, and Atlético Nacional), the four Copa Sudamericana qualifiers (Deportes Tolima, La Equidad, Deportivo Pasto, and Deportivo Cali), and Águilas Doradas as the best Primera A team that did not qualify for international competition in 2021, which entered the competition at this point. Unlike the previous edition, in which ties from the round of 16 onwards were played as single legs due to the schedule disruptions caused by the COVID-19 pandemic, in this edition all rounds were played on a double-legged basis.

Schedule 
The schedule of the competition was as follows:

First stage
The first stage was played by the 16 Categoría Primera B clubs, eight of which were seeded in the ties according to their placement in the 2020 season aggregate table. The remaining Primera B clubs were drawn into each tie. The seeded clubs (Team 2) hosted the second leg.

|}

First leg

Second leg

Second stage
The second stage was played by the eight first stage winners. In each tie, the clubs with the best performance in the first stage (Team 2) hosted the second leg.

|}

First leg

Second leg

Third stage
The third stage was played by the four second stage winners and 10 Categoría Primera A clubs that did not qualify for international competition, which were seeded in the ties according to their placement in the 2020 season aggregate table. The four second stage winners as well as the best four teams according to the 2020 Primera A aggregate table hosted the second leg.

|}

First leg

Second leg

Final stages
Each tie in the knockout stage was played in a home-and-away two-legged format. In each tie, the team which has the better overall record up to that stage hosted the second leg, except for the round of 16 where the third stage winners hosted the second leg. The teams entering the competition at this stage were the ones that qualified for the 2021 Copa Libertadores and 2021 Copa Sudamericana, as well as the best team in the Primera A aggregate table that did not qualify for either competition, which were drawn into each of the eight ties. In case of a tie on aggregate score, extra time was not played and the winner was decided in a penalty shoot-out.

Bracket

Round of 16
The teams qualifying from the third stage played the second leg at home.

|}

First leg

Second leg

Quarter-finals

|}

First leg

Second leg

Semi-finals

|}

First leg

Second leg

Finals

Atlético Nacional won 5–1 on aggregate.

See also
 2021 Categoría Primera A season
 2021 Categoría Primera B season

References

External links 
  

Copa Colombia seasons
2021 in Colombian football